Oktoc Creek is a stream in the U.S. state of Mississippi.

Oktoc is a name derived from the Choctaw language purported to mean "prairie".

References

Rivers of Mississippi
Rivers of Noxubee County, Mississippi
Rivers of Oktibbeha County, Mississippi
Mississippi placenames of Native American origin